Selbitz is a town in the district of Hof, in Bavaria, Germany.

Other places and rivers named Selbitz are:
Selbitz (Kemberg), a village, part of the town Kemberg, Saxony-Anhalt, Germany
Selbitz (river), a river in Bavaria and Thuringia, Germany.